Erika Raum is a Canadian violinist.

Biography 
Raum began playing professionally at age 12. She took first place at the 1992 Joseph Szigeti International Violin Competition in Budapest as well as the award for best interpretation of a Mozart concerto. She has performed in Hungary, Portugal, Sweden, Austria, Germany, England, Italy and France. She has appeared as a guest with the Budapest Radio Orchestra, the Szombathely Symphony Orchestra, the Austro-Hungarian Orchestra, and the Franz Liszt Chamber Orchestra.

Both a recitalist and chamber musician, Raum also performs frequently in Canada. She has performed at the Pablo Casals Festival in Prades, France, Beethoven Festival in Warsaw, the BargeMusic Festival in New York, and the Seattle Chamber Music Festival.

As a recording artist, Erika joined pianist Anton Kuerti on the world premiere recording of Carl Czerny's piano and violin works. Recorded on Musica Viva of CBC Records, this recording features Czerny's works during his teen years. Raum's most recent release for the Arktos label consisted of the Brahms Horn Trio and another recording premiere of Pantheon, by her mother, composer Elizabeth Raum. With pianist Lydia Wong, they will soon record the complete violin and piano works of Krzysztof Penderecki.

In 1993, Elizabeth Raum wrote her a violin concerto entitled Faces of Woman. The work was commissioned by the Regina Symphony Orchestra and broadcast nationally by the CBC. Erika's sister, Jessica Raum, produced and directed a documentary of the event, Like Mother, Like Daughter.

Erika is a graduate of the University of Toronto where she studied with Lorand Fenyves and was awarded the prestigious Eaton Scholarship upon her graduation. She is also a recipient of the Canada Council for the Arts Career Development Grant. Raum is currently on the faculties of the Glenn Gould School at The Royal Conservatory of Music, Toronto and the University of Toronto. She continues her presence on the summer faculty of the Banff Centre for the Arts and was a guest teacher at the Orford Arts Centre.

References 

Musicians from Toronto
Canadian classical violinists
Living people
Academic staff of The Royal Conservatory of Music
21st-century classical violinists
Year of birth missing (living people)
Women classical violinists
20th-century Canadian violinists and fiddlers
21st-century Canadian violinists and fiddlers
Canadian women violinists and fiddlers